The Pieces Fit is the third album by Considering Lily. It is the second album released after the duo changed their name from Serene & Pearl and the first since Jeanette Herdman replaced Serene Campbell in the duo.

Critical reception

Melinda Hill of AllMusic begins her review with, "The Pieces Fit, Pearl Barrett and Jeanette Herdman's first effort at continuing the duo Considering Lily, isn't a total failure. It isn't a total success either."

Michael Ehret of the Daily Vault concludes his review with, "This disc is fun. It's celebratory. It encourages. It affirms. It worships - in its own little cute way - and there's nothing wrong with that. Music is not this terribly serious endeavor that you really have to suffer to create. Sometimes it's just pure joy and you just stand back and let it flow over and through you."

Kevin Williams of Cross Rhythms gives the album an 8 out of a possible 10 and begins the review with, "If you are after a feel-good album then this is the one. The whole thing has the theme of God working in our lives running all the way through, and the effect is very positive."

Jenn Terry wrote a review for Jesus Freak Hideout and gives the album 2½ stars out of a possible 5. She starts the review with, "From the first song "Great Expectations," I felt as if I was stuck on a spaceship headed to a place where all they used to play music were drum machines and modern electronics. This, for me is a minus due to the fact that I love "real" instruments. The lyrics were good though, and Bible based."

Track listing

Personnel

1 – "Great Expectations"
Bass – James Greggory
Guitar – George Cocchini
Mixed By – Julian Kindred
Programmed By, Guitar, Producer – Michael Quinlan

2 – "Today"
Drums – Raymond Boyd
Keyboards – Brent Milligan, Dave Alan
Mixed By – Shane D. Wilson
Guitar, Bass, Percussion, Drum Programming, Producer – Barry Blair

3 – "What I Was Made For"
Drums – Derek Wyatt
Guitar, Bass Synthesizer, Additional Keyboards, Producer – Barry Blair
Mixed By – Shane D. Wilson
Programmed By – Michael Quinlan

4 – "Whisper"
Bass – Will McGinniss
Drums – Derek Wyatt
Guitar, Additional Programming, Keyboards, Producer – Barry Blair
Mixed By – Shane D. Wilson
Programmed By – Michael Quinlan

5 – "Complete Me"
Bass – James Gregory
Guitar – George Cocchini
Mixed By – Julian Kindred
Programmed By, Guitar, Producer – Michael Quinlan

6 – "Waiting For The Day"
Bass – James Gregory
Guitar – George Cocchini
Mixed By – Julian Kindred
Programmed By, Producer – Michael Quinlan

7 – "Electric"
Bass – Will McGinniss
Drums – Derek Wyatt
Guitar, Rhodes Electric Piano, Bass Synthesizer, Drum Programming, Percussion, Producer – Barry Blair
Keyboards – Dave Alan
Mixed By – Shane D. Wilson
Keyboards – Jeanette Herdman

8 – "Great Big God"
Bass – Will McGinniss
Drum Programming – Greg Harrington
Keyboards – Dave Alan, Jeff Savage
Mixed By – Shane D. Wilson
Guitar, Additional Programming, Producer – Barry Blair

9 – "Come Rescue Me"
Bass – Will McGinniss
Drum Programming, Synthesizer Programming – Kip Kubin
Drums – Derek Wyatt
Mixed By – Shane D. Wilson
Guitar, Producer – Barry Blair

10 – "I Want To Need To Know You"
Bass – Will McGinniss
Drum Programming – Dave Herrington
Drums – Derek Wyatt
Guitar, Additional Programming, Producer – Barry Blair
Keyboards – Dave Alan
Mixed By – Shane D. Wilson

11 – "Put Me In The Picture"
Mixed By – Paul Salvo
Percussion – Shane Holluman
Guitar Programmed By, Producer – Michael Quinlan

12 – "The Pieces Fit"
Drum Programming, Synthesizer Programming – Kip Kubin
Drums – Derek Wyatt
Guitar, Producer – Barry Blair
Piano – Pearl Barrett
Mixed By – Shane D. Wilson

Track information and credits adapted from Discogs and AllMusic. Verified from the album's liner notes.

References

External links
ForeFront Records Official Site

1999 albums
ForeFront Records albums
Contemporary Christian music albums by American artists